Jean François Orcel (3 May 1896 – 27 March 1978) was a French mineralogist who contributed to the French nuclear energy program following the discovery of Uranium vanadate deposits in Morocco. He served as a mineralogist at the Muséum National d’Histoire Naturelle in Paris. He later specialized in the chemistry of meteorites.

Orcel was born in Paris where his father Edouard was a public works engineer. His mother Pauline Lesuisse was a teacher. After studies at the Lycée Henri IV he went on to study at Sorbonne even though World War I broke out as poor health disqualified him from conscription. He became an assistant to Frédéric Wallerant in 1917 and in 1920 he joined the Muséum National d’Histoire Naturelle working under Alfred Lacroix. After Lacroix's retirement in 1937, Orcel succeeded him as professor of mineralogy. Orcel studied phyllosilicates and chlorites, examining water of crystallization in his doctoral work. He also went on field expeditions, collecting minerals and developing geological maps. He was involved in the acquisition of the mineral collection of Colonel Louis Vésigné (1870-1954). He examined the optical properties and polarization of minerals including methods for dealing with opaque minerals. During World War II he was involved in the resistance and in protecting the precious holdings of the museum. Following the war, he was involved in prospecting for uranium salts along with Louis Barrabé of which were found in Morocco. After retirement, he took an interest in meteorite chemistry. A mineral of nickel arsenate was named as Orcelite by his student Simone Caillère in 1959. He also worked with the meteorite researcher Elisabeth Jeremine (1879-1964).

References 

1896 births
1978 deaths
French mineralogists
People from Paris
University of Paris alumni